Lowber is an unincorporated community in Westmoreland County, Pennsylvania, United States. Lowber has a post office, with ZIP code 15660 and is the home of Lowber Volunteer fire department and a small park. This area does not have enough people living in the area to be called a town, so it is a village. The town has a Building which now occupies a company that used to be a school in the Yough school district. In the park there is the old school's bell.

External links 
 Lowber local community website

References

Unincorporated communities in Westmoreland County, Pennsylvania
Unincorporated communities in Pennsylvania